Milan Vitek (born Ostrava, Czech Republic, 30 August 1938) is a violinist, conductor, educator and Professor of Violin at Oberlin Conservatory of Music.

Studies 

Milan Vitek received his diploma in 1959 from the Brno Conservatory, where he studied with Prof. Julius Remeš, a student of Otakar Ševčík. He continued his studies with Prof. Jaroslav Pekelsky at the Academy of Performing Arts in Prague (AMU), where he graduated with a Soloist Performance Diploma cum laude in 1964. In [1961] he won a prize at the Thibaud Violin Competition in Paris, and in [YEAR] he won a prize in the Llangollen International Musical Eisteddfod in Wales, U.K.

Professional career 

After completing his studies, Vitek was a founding member, concertmaster and soloist with the Prague Chamber Soloists conducted by Vaclav Neumann, member of the Czech Nonet, an official chamber ensemble of the Czech Philharmonic Orchestra, and the piano trio Pro Camera.

In 1968, he won a position in the Royal Danish Orchestra and moved to Copenhagen, Denmark. From 1969 to 1972, he played in the Royal Danish Orchestra as alternate concert master, founded [NAME OF PIANO TRIO] with the Director of the Royal Danish Opera and later, the Sydney Opera, John Winther, as well as the Danish Chamber Orchestra. In 1970, he co-founded the Danish Chamber Orchestra.

In 1972, Vitek received an invitation to join the Czech String Quartet, resident at McMaster University in Hamilton, Ontario, where he also became a professor of violin. He also played as concert master[?] in the Hamilton Symphony Orchestra.

In 1974, he returned to Denmark  as Professor of Violin at the Royal Danish Academy of Music, a position which held until 2001. During his tenure there, he founded and conducted the Royal Danish Academy of Music Chamber Orchestra (1974), with which he toured to England, Scotland and Germany. He also co-founded the piano trio Trio Pro Arte, in which he played 1974-1999. With the Trio he toured throughout Europe, Canada and the United States, and  recorded the complete piano trios of Johannes Brahms, Bedrich Smetana's Piano Trio in G minor Op. 15 and Felix Mendelssohn-Bartholdy's second Piano Trio in C minor Op. 66 for the BIS label. In 1993, Vitek was also appointed Visiting Professor at The Faculty of Fine Applied and Performing Arts at Gothenburg University in Sweden.

In 2001, Vitek became Professor of Violin at The Conservatory of Music at Oberlin College, where he had previously been a Guest Professor in 1993-94.

Conducting 

As a conductor, Milan Vitek has been artistic director of the Camerata Roman (now Camerata Nordica) in Sweden (1985–88) and the Danish Sinfonietta in Denmark (1989-?). He has also guest conducted the Royal Danish Opera Orchestra, the Odense Symphony Orchestra, the Czech Radio SO, the Janáček Philharmonic Orchestra in the Czech Republic, the Fribourg Festival SO in Switzerland and numerous other orchestras throughout Scandinavia.

Teaching 

He has adjudicated international violin competitions in Denmark - where he is Chair of the Carl Nielsen International Music Competition - Germany, Japan, Estonia and Italy. His students are winners and laureates of among others the Carl Nielsen, J. Kocian, Heino Eller, Queen Elisabeth of Belgium, Washington International, Yehudi Menuhin International, the International Jean Sibelius Violin Competitions, and the Fischoff National Chamber Music Competition.

For his services to Danish cultural life, Milan Vitek received the Knight's Cross of Dannebrog, 1st Class, in 1999.

References

External links
https://www.hamu.cz/cs/katedry-obory/katedra-strunnych-nastroju/ (Katedra strunných nástrojů/ Department of String Studies at AMU)
http://www.nonet.cz/en/historie/60-leta/ (The Czech Nonet- history- 1960s)
https://cameratanordica.com/ (Camerata Nordica)
https://www.dr.dk/om-dr/nyheder/alle-burde-have-en-dansker-som-ven ("Alle burde have en dansker som ven")
https://www.dr.dk/nyheder/kultur/klassisk/carlnielsen2016-english/anna-agafia-egholm (Carl Nielsen Competition- Anna Agafia Egholm)
http://www.naxos.com/person/Trio_Pro_Arte/32937.htm
http://cncomp.odensesymfoni.dk/

1938 births
Oberlin Conservatory of Music faculty
Czech violinists
Male violinists
Royal Danish Academy of Music
Living people
21st-century violinists
21st-century Czech male musicians
Brno Conservatory alumni